The canton of Landerneau is an administrative division of the Finistère department, northwestern France. Its borders were modified at the French canton reorganisation which came into effect in March 2015. Its seat is in Landerneau.

It consists of the following communes:
 
La Forest-Landerneau
Landerneau
Lanneuffret
Pencran
Plouédern
La Roche-Maurice
Saint-Divy
Saint-Thonan
Trémaouézan

References

Cantons of Finistère